Khalilan-e Olya (also Romanized as Khalīlān-e ‘Olyā; also known as Khalīlān-e Bālā) is a village in Qaedrahmat Rural District, Zagheh District, Khorramabad County, Lorestan Province, Iran. At the 2006 census, its population was 371, in 94 families.

References 

Towns and villages in Khorramabad County